Gold and Grit is a 1925 American silent Western film directed by Richard Thorpe and starring Buddy Roosevelt, William H. Turner and Wilbur Mack.

Cast
 Buddy Roosevelt as Buddy
 Ann McKay as Helen Mason
 William H. Turner as Bill Mason
 L.J. O'Connor as Jim Crawford
 Wilbur Mack as Jack Crawford
 Nelson McDowell as Horatio Jefferson Blaabs
 Hank Bell as The Sheriff

References

Bibliography
 Connelly, Robert B. The Silents: Silent Feature Films, 1910-36, Volume 40, Issue 2. December Press, 1998.
 Munden, Kenneth White. The American Film Institute Catalog of Motion Pictures Produced in the United States, Part 1. University of California Press, 1997.

External links
 

1925 films
1925 Western (genre) films
1920s English-language films
American silent feature films
Silent American Western (genre) films
American black-and-white films
Films directed by Richard Thorpe
1920s American films